Marianne Schuppe (born 12 July 1959) is a vocalist, author, and composer of vocal music.

Biography 
Originally from Germany, Schuppe moved to Switzerland later in life. Schuppe has developed a unique "voice-body-technique" based on the breathing-work of Erika Kemmann (Institut für Atemlehre Berlin) and Atem-Tonus-Ton developed by Maria Höller. She is currently a guest-lecturer FHNW University of Music in Basel. As President of IGNM Basel she also curates a concert series of contemporary music. As a mentor, she has also participated in the Composers Meet Composers workshops at heim.art with fellow Wandelweiser artists/composers Emmanuelle Waeckerlé, Joachim Eckl, Antoine Beuger, and Jürg Frey.

In her work as a vocalist, she is best known for her recordings of Morton Feldman's Three Voices (col legno 2007) and the vocal works of Giacinto Scelsi (New Albion 2006). She has also recorded two albums of her own works on Edition Wandelweiser, slowsongs (2015) and nosongs (2018).

In 2008, Schuppe began developing a solo-work for voice and sparse accompaniment by lute and uber-bows. Her “slow songs” (2015) and “nosongs” (2018) have been called “a radical re-weighing of all traditional ingredients of song”. Her voice is described as “highly distinctive...without the stylized character of a classical trained singer”. In her review of "nosongs" for The Wire, Tabitha Piseno stated that Schuppe's “combination of accuracy and elusiveness, intimacy and distance may also bring to mind Samuel Beckett’s most radically reductionist prose works, pure constructions infiltrated by the impure world of given things”.

Schuppe’s works include text scores, poems, essays and ensemble pieces for trained voices as well as non-trained voices.

Compositions 

Die Summe (2019) for choirs in public spaces
Salz, Lücke, Zelt (2018/2019) for 8 voices
 distant shapes / ferne Formen (2019) for voice and tape
 der blumen (2017) for voices performed by Sotto Voce Vocal Collective
 ortlos über die Küste hinaus (2016) for voices
 notes from the hill (2015) for voice and one instrument
 Sapphosongs (2015) for voice and one instrument
 slow songs (2013–15) for voice, lute, e-bows
 Laub (2014) for two voices 
 am Fenster (2014) for solo voice 
 asunder (2013) for voices 
 tidstrand (2009) for voice and instruments 
 Avers (2008) for voice, lute, e-bows
 Hitzewelle (2004) music for video work by Andrea Wolfensberger
 temps (1998) for 8 voices 
 stilleben (1997) for solo voice 
 wandern (1996) for voice and tape 
 Fahrzeug (1994) for 14 voices 
 das imzu plaudern (1993) for voice and tape 
 solo for voice (1988)

Essays and lectures in German 

 Musik - Performance - Bewegungen / Ein schleichender Ruck in : Aufzeichnen und Erinnern. Performance Chronik Basel Band II (1987–2006), Hg. v. Sabine Gebhardt Fink, Muda Mathis, Margarit von Büren. Diaphanes Verlag Zürich/Berlin 2016.
 Without. Nachdenken über ein «Singen ohne ...» am Beispiel von fünf Songs des 20. Jahrhunderts in : dissonance #134, 2016
 Man kann ihnen auch einfach zuhören. Zur Arbeit der Weberin und Textildesignerin Isabel Bürgin, 2016
 Die Ahnung als Motor in Potentiale des Vergessens, edited by André Blum, Theresa Georgen, Wolfgang Knapp, Veronika Sellier, Königshausen und Neumann, Würzburg 2012
 Die doppelte Stelle, Singen und Sprechen in der Musik G. Scelsis in: Verkörperungen, Max-Planck-Institut für Wissenschaftsgeschichte, preprint 416, André Blum et al. [ed.], 2011 und im Akademie Verlag, Berlin 2012 
 Übersetzen als Arbeitsweise. Programmnotiz zu : Hochland- Übersetzungen, Hans-Jürg Meier, Sarah Giger, Balts Nill, Marianne Schuppe
 Der Wohnwagen, Die Vorbereitung der Musik in : Aspekte der freien Improvisation in der Musik, Hrsg. Dieter Nanz, Wolke Verlag, 2011
 Die Indianer kommen näher, Ein Gespräch in Emails mit Michael Kunkel, in : dissonanz # 106 Juni 2009
 Potentiale des Vergessens - ein Gespräch mit Aleida Assmann, André Blum, Wolfgang Knapp, Theresa Georgen, Marianne Schuppe und Veronika Sellier, in : du magazin, Januar/Februar 2011

References

External links 
 

20th-century German women writers
20th-century German composers
1959 births
Living people
20th-century German writers
21st-century German women writers
21st-century German composers
20th-century German women singers
21st-century German women singers
German women composers
20th-century women composers
21st-century women composers